John Gilbert Alexander  (born 4 July 1951) is a former Australian politician and former professional tennis player.

As a tennis player, Alexander reached a career-high singles rank of No. 8 in the world in 1975. He reached the semi-finals of the Australian Open singles on three occasions, and won the doubles in 1975 and 1982. He also played in the Australian team that won the 1977 Davis Cup. After the end of his playing career, Alexander worked as a tennis commentator and managed various sports-related businesses.

Alexander won the Division of Bennelong for the Liberal Party at the 2010 election, and retained the seat in 2013 and 2016. He resigned on 11 November 2017 due to constitutional ineligibility arising from his dual citizenship of the United Kingdom. He renounced his UK citizenship and stood as the Liberal Party candidate at the by-election, held on 16 December 2017, which he won. In November 2021, Alexander announced his retirement from politics.

Early life
Alexander was born in Sydney. His father, Gilbert Alexander, was born in Essex, England, in 1907 and moved to Australia at the age of three.

Tennis career

During a tennis career spanning the late 1960s to mid-1980s, Alexander won seven tour singles titles and 27 doubles titles, and earned a total of $1,214,079 (USD) in prize money. He achieved a career best singles ranking of World No. 8 in December 1975. Alexander is the youngest player to represent Australia in the Davis Cup.  He was also one of Australia's longest serving Davis Cup players, representing his country from 1968 to 1983. From 1974 to 1986, Alexander served as the resident tennis professional at Lamar Hunt's World Championship Tennis Peachtree World of Tennis Club in Peachtree Corners, Georgia US.

Alexander served as captain of the Australian Fed Cup team and worked as a sports commentator for Australian (Channel 7) and British (BBC) television networks for over 20 years.

Business career
As managing director of Next Generation Clubs Australia, Alexander designed and built sport and fitness clubs; including the Ryde Aquatic Centre in Sydney to host the 2000 Summer Olympic Games water polo event, the development of Memorial Drive in Adelaide into a multi-function health and fitness facility, and Royal King's Park in Perth.

In 1995 Alexander served as referee during the first series run of the Australian adaptation of the television series Gladiators.

Shortly before his election to Parliament in 2010, Alexander's Tennis Professionals won a High Court case for the right to redevelop the White City Tennis Centre in Sydney.

Alexander also managed a variety of small businesses in the retail and sporting sectors.

Political career
Alexander is a member of the Moderate/Modern Liberal faction of the Liberal Party.

As a Liberal Party candidate, John Alexander won the seat of Bennelong from the Australian Labor Party in the 2010 election with a swing of 4.52 points, giving a two-party-preferred margin of 3.1 points.

Alexander delivered his maiden speech to parliament on 28 October 2010, detailing his particular interest in areas of preventative health, infrastructure, transport and sustainable growth. During his first term Alexander was put in charge of several internal policy committees, with a particular focus on regional development and policies to tackle urban congestion.

In October 2011 Alexander ran the inaugural Bennelong Cup Table Tennis Test match, involving players from China, Korea and Australia playing in a formal competition in Ryde, a suburb within his constituency. In October 2012 the opening games were played in the Great Hall of Parliament House, Canberrathe first competitive sporting event ever played there. The Ambassadors for China and Korea participated in a friendly competition with Alexander and Minister for Sport Kate Lundy. The Bennelong Cup is the celebration of Alexander's Bennelong Schools Table Tennis Program which has put tables in all 40 Bennelong schools to encourage social interaction between students of different cultural backgrounds, together with a healthy activity. The Bennelong Cup has continued every year since with an interschool tournament followed by international competition in Ryde, preceded by exhibition matches in Parliament House, Canberra.

Alexander has also established a range of other local programs including Bennelong Gardens, which provides work opportunities for people with disabilities in specially designed market gardens, and Bennelong Village Business program which promotes the benefits of local small business shopping and negotiates discounted advertising rates for small businesses in the local newspaper. John Alexander received much publicity for his 100 km charity walk around Bennelong to raise money and awareness of motor neurone disease after the loss of two close friends to the disease.

Alexander was not challenged in Liberal preselection in 2012. In the 2013 election Alexander was re-elected as Member for Bennelong, increasing his two party preferred margin to 7.8 points.

In September 2013 Alexander was appointed chair of the House of Representatives Standing Committee on Tax & Revenue, a role in which he worked on improving access to 'light touch' tax returns for individuals with simple tax affairs. Following this he was appointed chair of the House Standing Committee on Economics, where he instigated an inquiry into home ownership and opportunities for tax reform. Following Malcolm Turnbull's ascension to Prime Minister John Alexander was appointed chair of the newly formed House Standing Committee on Infrastructure, Transport & Cities, where he commenced an inquiry into transport connectivity, regional development, high speed rail and the use of value capture as an innovative funding mechanism.

Alexander also served as chair of the Coalition Policy Committees on Infrastructure & Regional Development, and on Tourism, of the Sydney Airport Community Forum, and of the Australia-East Asia Parliamentary Network.

As a strong proponent of high-speed rail linking Australia's eastern seaboard, Alexander delivered the keynote speech at a high-speed rail conference at University of Melbourne in February 2014, highlighting the resultant opportunities for regional development and reduction in traffic congestion in major cities.

Alexander was not challenged in Liberal preselection in 2016. In the 2016 election, he was re-elected as member for Bennelong, earning a small swing toward him despite the state - and the nation - swinging toward Labor. Alexander's hold on Bennelong was largely attributed to his high personal vote in the electorate.

During the Australian parliamentary eligibility crisis, on 6 November 2017, it was reported that Alexander might also be a British citizen and so had never been eligible for election to the Parliament. On 11 November 2017, Alexander resigned from parliament after conceding that he was likely a dual citizen, necessitating a by-election in Bennelong. He renounced his UK citizenship and stood as the Liberal Party candidate at the by-election, held on 16 December 2017. During his campaigning, a YouTube video of Alexander in the 1990s, uploaded in 2011, was resurfaced in the media. The video displays Alexander telling racist jokes at an end of year party with film crew from the 1990s TV show Gladiators. Once the video was shared with the ABC, Alexander immediately released a written statement that described how the jokes were "completely unacceptable". Alexander elaborated: "There is no place for jokes about violence against women. Again, I apologise unreservedly". Then Prime Minister, Malcolm Turnbull, praised Alexander's claims, saying his apology was "a measure of the man [...] Not all disrespect of women ends up in violence against women but that's where all violence against women begins, so all of us need to reflect on that. John has done so." Alexander's high profile opponent in the by-election, Kristina Keneally, appeared with then opposition leader Bill Shorten in Eastwood to respond to the incident. Shorten said that "The comments are crass, they're wrong, they're stupid, and the apology is 22 years too late". At a press conference, Mr Shorten denied allegations that Labor had deliberately sourced the video in an attempt to bait Alexander during the campaign. Despite this setback, Alexander was safely re-elected, despite suffering a 4.84% two party preferred swing against him to Keneally and Labor. This reduced the Liberal Party's hold in Bennelong from 9.72% to 4.88%, making the seat marginal and at its most vulnerable position for the Coalition since John Howard's reliance on preference votes in 2004 to hold the seat by 4.33%.

In the lead up to the 2019 election, Alexander was scrutinised for his comments in response to Fijian Prime Minister Frank Bainimarama. Bainimarama had asked the Australian Government to "please stop burning coal, you know the water level's just coming up and it's threatening our communities", to which Alexander responded "move to higher ground". Speaking at a community function in his electorate, Alexander elaborated: "It’s very much like your house is on fire, your children are in the house – should you call the fire brigade and get the children out of the house?" This statement was considered inflammatory by his Labor opponent, Brian Owler, who stated that "he [Alexander] says if the house is on fire to get out. Well, we don’t have a second house - or planet - to run to. It would be better if we didn’t start the fire in the first place." Bainimarama replied to Alexander in a formal statement to Fiji press members, imploring that "Fiji is lucky we even have the higher ground to allow for relocation at all. I’m keen to hear what Alexander believes the people of Kiribati should do in the face of rising seas, where the highest point in their country sits at just 1.8 metres above sea level." Alexander later appeared on ABC Radio, clarifying the nature of his remarks by saying that adaptation was "a priority [...] we must also act to prevent further damage to our planet". Despite the controversy, Alexander comfortably retained Bennelong, albeit suffering a 2.8% swing away from him.

In November 2021, Alexander opted to not contest the next election, deciding to retire from politics. Shortly following his announcement, Alexander spoke with Paul Bongiorno of The Saturday Paper, reflecting on his experiences and time in office. Alexander criticised Prime Minister Scott Morrison, claiming that "people are tired of the way we engage with each other. All we do is bash each other." Bongiorno's opinion piece later writes that Alexander 'reserves his biggest salvos for the leadership of the Coalition government: Scott Morrison, Josh Frydenberg and Barnaby Joyce', and feels that 'if Labor’s Anthony Albanese wins the election, policies more fit to serve the national interest rather than narrow sectional interest might be served'. This insight was deemed to be damaging for the Coalition, with Bennelong named as a 'key seat' for the upcoming election by ABC election analyst Antony Green. Bennelong had only been won by Labor once in nearly 80 years, and was gained for them again by Jerome Laxale at the 2022 election.

Tennis career finals

Singles: 27 (7 titles, 20 runner-ups)

Doubles: 53 (28 titles, 25 runner-ups)

Grand Slam singles performance timeline

Personal
Alexander was briefly married, while in the United States, to a Canadian model and later married to Rosemary Brown, a former Olympic swimmer, for almost ten years. He and the former Ms. Brown have three children: Emily (1990), Georgia (1991) and Charles (1994). Alexander no longer lives in his electorate, but continued to rent an apartment in Epping.

Honours
On 26 January 1992, he was awarded the Medal of the Order of Australia.

On 30 August 2000, he was awarded the Australian Sports Medal.

References

External links

 
 
 
 
 
 

1951 births
Australian male tennis players
Australian Open (tennis) champions
Australian Open (tennis) junior champions
Australian sportsperson-politicians
Australian television presenters
Grand Slam (tennis) champions in men's doubles
Liberal Party of Australia members of the Parliament of Australia
Living people
Members of the Australian House of Representatives for Bennelong
Politicians from Sydney
Recipients of the Australian Sports Medal
Recipients of the Medal of the Order of Australia
Sportsmen from New South Wales
Tennis players from Sydney
Australian tennis commentators
Wimbledon junior champions
21st-century Australian politicians
Grand Slam (tennis) champions in boys' singles